Jonathan Spratt (born 28 April 1986) is a former Welsh international rugby union player. A centre, he made his debut for the Wales national rugby union team on 30 May 2009 as a second-half substitute in a match versus Canada.

Spratt is a former playing member of The Legion rugby sevens team and is an honorary Legionnaire – an honour also held by his older brother Andrew.

In 2008, Spratt signed with Taranaki to play in the Air New Zealand Cup.

In May 2011 Spratt joined London Irish from the Ospreys and in July 2012 he rejoined the Ospreys

References

External links
Ospreys profile
WRU profile

1986 births
Living people
Exeter Chiefs players
London Irish players
Ospreys (rugby union) players
People educated at Dwr-y-Felin Comprehensive School
Rugby union players from Neath
Wales international rugby union players
Welsh rugby union players
Taranaki rugby union players
Rugby union centres